Joël Rakotomalala (Toliara Province, 29 March 1929 — Antsirabe, 30 July 1976) was a Malagasy military officer and politician.

Biography 
Colonel of the Madagascar People's Armed Forces, he was Prime Minister of the Democratic Republic of Madagascar from 13 January 1976 to his death, under the presidency of Admiral Didier Ratsiraka. He was a member of the Association for the Rebirth of Madagascar. He died in the accident of an Aérospatiale Alouette III transport helicopter during a short flight with the chief of staff Alphonse Rakotonirainy on 30 July 1976, the last month of the presence of the French Armed Forces in Madagascar. He was replaced on 12 August as Prime Minister by Justin Rakotoniaina.

The accident 
The maximum seven-seat transport helicopter, with more than 40 kilograms of luggage, took off from Antananarivo on 30 July 1976 for several successive flights. It crashed at the third stage, around noon. In view of the inflamed political situation, the accident gave rise to suspicions of sabotage.

References

|-

1929 births
1976 deaths
Association for the Rebirth of Madagascar politicians
Malagasy military personnel
Victims of aviation accidents or incidents in Madagascar
Victims of aviation accidents or incidents in 1976
Victims of helicopter accidents or incidents
State leaders killed in aviation accidents or incidents
Prime Ministers of Madagascar